Arizelana margaritobola is a species of moth of the family Tortricidae. It is found in New Guinea.

References

Archipini
Moths described in 1953
Moths of New Guinea
Taxa named by Alexey Diakonoff